The QJY-201, is a Chinese general purpose machine gun designed and manufactured by Norinco for the People's Liberation Army. The weapon is publicly unveiled at Zhuhai Airshow in September 2021. The weapon is chambered with the DJP-201 7.62×51mm cartridge, and features an unusual open-bolt, hybrid short stroke, short recoil operation. The medium machinegun features weight reduction design, such as lightweight material for the body and detachable box magazine made of fabric, reducing the weight to less than 8 kg (17.6 lb) when empty.

Users
 : People's Liberation Army

See also
 QJS-161
 QJY-88
 XM250
 Mk 48 machine gun
 PKP Pecheneg machine gun
 Lightweight Medium Machine Gun
 FN EVOLYS
 HK MG5

References

General-purpose machine guns
Medium machine guns
Machine guns of the People's Republic of China
7.62×51mm NATO machine guns